Egged Transportation Ltd is the largest transit bus company in Israel. Egged's intercity bus routes reach most Israeli cities, towns, kibbutzim and moshavim, and the company operates urban city buses throughout the country. It also operates in Poland and the Netherlands through a subsidiary.

Egged provides about 35% of Israel's public transport services, employs about 6,500 workers and operates a fleet of 2,950 buses. Egged buses transport about 900,000 passengers per day.

History 

Egged was created in 1933 through a merger of four smaller intercity bus cooperatives in and around Tel Aviv. In 1942, it was joined with the bus company United Sharon. In 1951, Egged merged with the northern Shahar bus company and the southern Drom Yehuda bus company, creating a national public transportation network. In 1961, Egged merged with the Hamekasher bus company of Jerusalem. The name Egged (lit. Union) was given to the cooperative by the Israeli poet Hayim Nahman Bialik.

During the wars of 1956, 1967 and 1973, Egged buses and drivers helped to reinforce the logistics system of the IDF and drove soldiers and food to the battlefields. Some buses also served as ambulances to transport injured soldiers and civilians. 

In late 2002, Egged sued the Palestinian National Authority and its chairman Yasser Arafat for compensation of damages and loss of income due to terrorist attacks and suicide bombings on buses during the Second Intifada, claiming that the attacks had deterred passengers from taking buses. On February 3, 2003, the Tel Aviv District Court ruled that Arafat has to pay Egged NIS 52 million in damages for the loss of one year's income and NIS 100,000 in court expenses.

Despite deregulation attempts by the Israeli prime minister Benjamin Netanyahu, Egged is still Israel's largest bus company, is subsidized by the government, and still controls most of the inter-city bus lines in Israel.  Netanyahu's attempts were cut short by a bus strike that brought the country to a halt, and Egged's workers and directors declared that any further attempts to undermine the company's monopoly will be met with similar measures. However, in recent years, many bus lines have begun to be operated by smaller bus companies such as Dan, Kavim, Superbus, Connex and others. In 2005, Egged and the Israeli Government reached an agreement under which by the year 2015 subsidization will be reduced to specific sectors, the disabled, soldiers and students, and for certain equipment.

In 2019, members voted overwhelmingly to convert Egged into a company from a worker cooperative. Had its members voted to not convert its ownership structure, the government could have cancelled an operating agreement it signed with Egged in November 2018, tender out its routes, and impose various sanctions until it decides to convert into a company.

Bus fleet 

Egged's bus fleet include a wide variety of bus models of Mercedes-Benz, VDL, Volvo, DAF and MAN, including bulletproof versions used mostly for travel in the West Bank. Historically, the company also extensively used buses by Leyland, Neoplan, Jonckheere, International, Fiat and more.

International ventures 
Egged has purchased 51% of the Bulgarian Trans-Triumph bus company, which runs service to cities such as Varna and Sofia, as well as airport and tour buses for approximately €4 million. Egged, through its affiliated company, is responsible for the operation of half the public transportation in the city of Varna, the second-largest city in Bulgaria with about half a million residents. Egged also formed a joint venture company with Rousse municipality called Egged Rousse JSC which operates the public transport in the city of Rousse.

Egged operates some 1,500 buses in Poland, where it owns the Polish bus company Mobilis it acquired for €4 million in 2006. The company operates some metropolitan bus routes, including exclusive franchises in Warsaw, Kraków and Bartoszyce. Mobilis in Warsaw operate 215 buses for public transportation and serves around 40 routes daily. Also, it uses Scania coach for football team Legia Warszawa and some other buses for special transports and tourism.

Egged Bus Services (EBS) also holds an eight-year contract (with an option for an additional two years) worth about €500 million, for public transport in the region  in the Netherlands starting December 2011. The contract drew opposition from local activist groups who accuse Egged of supporting Israel's settlements policy in the West Bank, and consider the company's winning the tender as indirect Dutch support for Israel's settlements policy, according to reports by Radio Netherlands Worldwide. Egged's Dutch subsidiary denies being involved in politics.

Jerusalem Light Rail 
In October 2010, Egged bought Veolia Transport's share in the Jerusalem Light Rail after a deal with the Dan Bus Company fell through. However, in March 2018 it was revealed that Egged will be prohibited from tendering to operate the light rail over competition concerns.

Tel Aviv Light Rail 
Egged has been awarded the tender to operate and maintain the Tel Aviv Red Line from October 2021 by the NTA Metropolitan Mass Transit System Ltd. tenders committee. The winning bid was from the Tevel consortium controlled by Egged (51%) with Chinese companies Shenzhen Metro (30%) and CCECC (19%). The tender win is subject to approval by the Israel Antitrust Authority.

"Mehadrin" routes 

From the late 1990s until January 2011, Egged operated gender-segregated lines, commonly called Mehadrin bus lines mainly running in and/or between major Haredi population centers. In these buses, men sat at the front and women were expected to wear "modest dress." The "mehadrin" lines were criticized after a woman, Miriam Shear, was allegedly assaulted for refusing to give up her seat to a male passenger and move to the back of the bus. In January 2011, the Israeli High Court of Justice ruled that forced separation of men and women on buses was illegal but allowed voluntary separation for a one-year experimental period. The court, accepting the recommendations of an investigation committee, ordered the removal of signs designating buses as segregated and the installation of new signs informing passengers of their right to sit wherever they wanted.

The Haredi public has requested to operate private bus lines but they were blocked by the transportation ministry.

Tourism 

In later years Egged Bus Cooperative has expanded its services, through its subsidiary company Egged Tours, by offering organized trips abroad for Israelis as well as daily tours in Israel for tourists. Egged Tours is an IATA licensed company which operates as a wholesale company for organized tours all over the world and Israel for groups and individuals. Its services include flights, organized tours, accommodation and trips all year round.

Criticism

Involvement in Israeli settlements

On 12 February 2020, the United Nations published a database of companies doing business related in the West Bank, including East Jerusalem, as well as in the occupied Golan Heights. Egged was listed on the database on account of its activities in Israeli settlements in these occupied territories, which are considered illegal under international law.

See also 
List of Egged bus routes in Israel
 List of bus routes in Jerusalem
 Economy of Israel
 Transportation in Israel
 Egged Ta'avura

References

External links 

 Egged Official website
 About Us – Official Egged Website
 Picture of Egged buses
 Hamekasher – A website dedicated to a bus company operated in Jerusalem until 1967

Bus companies of Israel
Cooperatives in Israel
Worker cooperatives
Transport companies established in 1933
Bus transport in the Netherlands
Bus transport in Bulgaria
Bus transport in Poland
Israeli brands
Companies based in Tel Aviv
Jewish businesses established in Mandatory Palestine
1933 establishments in Mandatory Palestine